Kistelek is a district in western part of Csongrád County. Kistelek is also the name of the town where the district seat is found. The district is located in the Southern Great Plain Statistical Region.

Geography 
Kistelek District borders with Kiskunfélegyháza District (Bács-Kiskun County) and Csongrád District to the north, Hódmezővásárhely District to the east, Szeged District to the southeast, Mórahalom District to the south, Kiskunmajsa District (Bács-Kiskun County) to the west. The number of the inhabited places in Kistelek District is 6.

Municipalities 
The district has 1 town and 5 villages.
(ordered by population, as of 1 January 2012)

The bolded municipality is the city.

Demographics

In 2011, it had a population of 18,185 and the population density was 44/km².

Ethnicity
Besides the Hungarian majority, the main minorities are the Roma (approx. 500) and Romanian (200).

Total population (2011 census): 18,185
Ethnic groups (2011 census): Identified themselves: 16,842 persons:
Hungarians: 15,933 (94.60%)
Gypsies: 475 (2.82%)
Romanians: 219 (1.30%)
Others and indefinable: 215 (1.28%)
Approx. 1,500 persons in Kistelek District did not declare their ethnic group at the 2011 census.

Religion
Religious adherence in the county according to 2011 census:

Catholic – 11,215 (Roman Catholic – 11,185; Greek Catholic – 30);
Reformed – 464;
Evangelical – 52;
Orthodox – 31;
other religions – 153; 
Non-religious – 1,928; 
Atheism – 142;
Undeclared – 4,200.

Gallery

See also
List of cities and towns of Hungary

References

External links
 Postal codes of the Kistelek District

Districts in Csongrád-Csanád County